Henry Eaton may refer to:

 Henry Eaton, 1st Baron Cheylesmore (1816–1891), British businessman, politician, and art collector
 Henry L. Eaton (1834–1890), Wisconsin politician
 Henry Eaton (footballer), Australian rules footballer

See also 
 Henry Smith Van Eaton (1826–1898), attorney, politician and military officer